Seropédica (Silk Farm) is a municipality located in Greater Rio de Janeiro, Brazil, 75 km from the state capital of Rio de Janeiro.  Its population was 83,092 (2020) and its area is 284 km².

Mayor 
 Lucas Dutra

Education 
The municipality is home of the main campus of the Rural Federal University of Rio de Janeiro (UFRRJ) and an Embrapa research institute focused on agroecology.

Sports 
 Annual Student Games

Neighborhoods 
 Águas Lindas
 Canto do Rio
 Campo Lindo
 Dom Bosco
 Jardim das Acácias 
 Parque Jacimar
 Piranema 
 INCRA
 Ecologia
 Fazenda Caxias 
 Centro de Seropédica 
 Boa Esperança
 Multirão 
 Boa Fé
 Santa Sofia
 Jardim Maracanã
 Vera Cruz
 Vila Sônia 
 Belvedere
 São Miguel
 Nossa Senhora de Nazaré

Notability
The bacterium Herbaspirillum seropedicae is named after Seropédica, as it was isolated in the locality.

References 

Municipalities in Rio de Janeiro (state)